The Reverse Address Resolution Protocol (RARP) is an obsolete computer communication protocol used by a client computer to request its Internet Protocol (IPv4) address from a computer network, when all it has available is its link layer or hardware address, such as a MAC address. The client broadcasts the request and does not need prior knowledge of the network topology or the identities of servers capable of fulfilling its request.

RARP is described in Internet Engineering Task Force (IETF) publication RFC 903.  It has been rendered obsolete by the Bootstrap Protocol (BOOTP) and the modern Dynamic Host Configuration Protocol (DHCP), which both support a much greater feature set than RARP.

RARP requires one or more server hosts to maintain a database of mappings of Link Layer addresses to their respective protocol addresses. Media Access Control (MAC) addresses need to be individually configured on the servers by an administrator. RARP is limited to serving only IP addresses.

Reverse ARP differs from the Inverse Address Resolution Protocol (InARP) described in RFC 2390, which is designed to obtain the IP address associated with a local Frame Relay data link connection identifier. InARP is not used in Ethernet.

Modern Day Uses

Although the original uses for RARP have been superseded by different protocols, some modern day protocols use RARP to handle MAC migration, particularly in virtual machines, using a technique originating in QEMU.

Examples are:
 Cisco's Overlay Transport Virtualization (OTV).  RARP is used to update the layer 2 forwarding tables when a MAC address moves between data centers.
 VMware vSphere's vMotion.  RARP is used when a VM MAC moves between hosts.

See also
Maintenance Operations Protocol (MOP)

References

Internet protocols
Internet Standards
Link protocols